The 2021 New Zealand National League was the first scheduled season of the National League since its restructuring in 2021. 30 clubs competed in the competition, with four having been planned to qualify from the Northern League, three qualifying from the Central League and two qualifying from the Southern League for the National Championship phase along with the automatically qualified Wellington Phoenix Reserves.
Each team was allowed to field a maximum of four foreign players as well as one additional foreign player who has Oceania Football Confederation nationality. Each team had to also have at least two players aged 20 or under in the starting eleven.

Because the Wellington Phoenix Reserves need to hold a partnership with an affiliated club through a Memorandum of Understanding (MoU) to be in the league and have a place in the Championship phase, their current MoU was with Lower Hutt City. This meant Lower Hutt could not qualify for the Championship even if they finish in the top three of the Central League.

New Zealand Football announced on the 14 September that they had decided to terminate the remainder of the Northern League season and cancel any yet to be played fixtures due to Covid-19 and Auckland being in Level 4. The decision was made due to the fact that they couldn't complete all the games before the Championship phase was due to begin, so places in the next phase where awarded off the standing before Auckland went into lockdown.

On the 8 October, New Zealand Football announced a change in plans to the Championship phase of the 2021 competition due to COVID-19 alert levels. The Championship phase was to be split up into two 'Hubs', the Auckland Hub and the South Hub, where teams play every other team in their hub in a single round robin. The top two clubs from each hub would have then qualified for a finals phase consisting of semis and a Grand Final.

On the 2 November, after confirmation that the alert levels would not change to allow the Auckland and Waikato teams to play any further part in the National Competition, New Zealand Football announced that they were cancelling the reminder of the National League. In its place, they instead decided on a one-off interregional competition, the National League: South Central Series.

Qualifying leagues

2021 Northern League

Northern League teams

Source:

Northern League table

Melville won 1–0, but West Coast fielded an ineligible player. Result upgraded to a 3–0 win for Melville.
North Shore won 2–0, but West Coast fielded an ineligible player. Result upgraded to a 3–0 win for North Shore.
League completed early with games still in hand due to Covid-19 and Auckland being in Level 4.

Northern League results table

Northern League scoring

Northern League top scorers

Northern League hat-tricks

2021 Central League

Central League teams

Central League table

Central League results table

Central League scoring

Central League top scorers

Central League hat-tricks

2021 Southern League

Southern League teams 
Unlike the Northern and Central Leagues, the Southern League is the culmination of two regional tournaments, each of which provide teams to the Southern League in much the same way as the Northern, Central, and Southern Leagues provide teams for the National League. The top five teams in the Mainland Premier League and top three teams from the FootballSouth Premier League qualify for entry into the Southern League.

Southern League table

Southern League results table

Southern League scoring

Southern League top scorers

Southern League hat-tricks

Qualified clubs

Championship phase

South Central Series

With confirmation that the alert levels were not changing to a level that would allow Auckland and Waikato teams to play in the National Competition, New Zealand Football announced that they were cancelling the rest of the National League. In its place, they instead decided on a one-off interregional competition, the National League: South Central Series. New Zealand Football also confirmed that the National League: South Central Series did not have any bearing on OFC Champions League qualification, which is separately being discussed with the OFC.

South Central table

South Central results table

South Central positions by round
The table lists the positions of teams after each week of matches. To preserve chronological evolvements, any postponed matches are not included in the round at which they were originally scheduled, but added to the full round they were played immediately afterwards. For example, if a match is scheduled for round 13, but then postponed and played between rounds 16 and 17, it is added to the standings for round 16.

Grand Final

Statistics

Top scorers

Hat-tricks

Records
The records that follow are accurate as of the end of the 2021 South Central Series. Only games played in the South Central Series (including the final) are considered below. As the 2021 National League season was cancelled, this series is not officially part of the National League records.
 Biggest home win: – Wellington Phoenix Reserves 6–0 Western Suburbs (4 December 2021)
 Biggest away win: – Selwyn United 0–5 Wellington Phoenix Reserves (27 November 2021)
 Highest scoring match: 9 goals – Miramar Rangers 7–2 Wellington Olympic (12 December 2021)
 Most goals scored in the season: 15 – Wellington Olympic, Wellington Phoenix Reserves
 Most goals scored in the season (including final): 20 – Miramar Rangers
 Fewest goals conceded in the season: 4 – Cashmere Technical
 Highest points in the season: 11 – Miramar Rangers

Awards

References

External links
 National League website 

New Zealand Football Championship
New Zealand Football Championship
2020–21 in New Zealand association football
New Zealand National League seasons